Kappa is a family of solid-fuel Japanese sounding rockets, which were built starting from 1956.

Rockets

Kappa 1
 Ceiling: 40 km
 Takeoff thrust: 10.00 kN
 Diameter: 0.13 m
 Length: 2.70 m

Kappa 2
 Ceiling: 40 km
 Mass: 300 kg
 Diameter: 0.22 m
 Length: 5 m

Kappa 6 (in two stages)
 Pay load: 20 kg
 Ceiling: 60 km
 Takeoff weight: 270 kg
 Diameter: 0.25 m
 Length: 5.61 m

Kappa 7
 Ceiling: 50 km
 Diameter: 0.42 m
 Length: 8.70 m

Kappa 8 (in two stages)
 Pay load: 50 kg
 Ceiling: 160 km
 Takeoff weight: 1500 kg
 Diameter: 0.42 m
 Length: 10.90 m

Kappa 4
 Ceiling: 80 km
 Takeoff thrust: 105.00 kN
 Diameter: 0.33 m
 Length: 5.90 m

Kappa 9L
 Pay load: 15 kg
 Ceiling: 350 km
 Takeoff weight: 1550 kg
 Diameter: 0.42 m
 Length: 12.50 m

Kappa 9M
 Pay load: 50 kg 
 Ceiling: 350 km 
 Mass: 1500 kg 
 Diameter: 0.42 m 
 Length: 11.10 m

Kappa 8L
 Pay load: 25 kg
 Ceiling: 200 km
 Takeoff weight: 350 kg
 Diameter: 0.25 m
 Length: 7.30 m

Kappa 10
 Ceiling: 742 km

See also

 R-25 Vulkan

External links
 Kappa-Rocket

Solid-fuel rockets
Sounding rockets of Japan
Japanese inventions